The women's football tournament at the 2019 Pacific Games is being held from 8 to 20 July 2019. It is the 5th edition of the women's Pacific Games football tournament. Together with the men's competition, all matches are being played at the J.S. Blatter Stadium in Apia, Samoa.

Teams

Venues

Group stage

Group A

Group B

Final stage

Bronze final

Gold final

Goalscorers

See also
Football at the 2019 Pacific Games – Men's tournament
Football at the 2019 Pacific Games
Football at the Pacific Games

References

External links
Official 2019 Pacific Games website

Womens